The Missouri Chamber Music Festival and Adult Chamber Music Intensive (ACMI) was founded in 2010.  The goal of the MOCM Festival concerts is to present the fine art of small ensemble music to a wide audience through an accessible, community-based festival.  The ACMI workshop is the educational portion of the festival, placing adult instrumentalists in chamber ensembles with Festival artists for coaching and performance.

History
The MOCM Festival and ACMI was incorporated by Scott Andrews and Nina Ferrigno in 2010 and presented its inaugural season in June 2011.  MOCM Advisors include Gil Rose, Music Director, Boston Modern Orchestra Project and Odyssey Opera; David Robertson, Music Director Emeritus, Saint Louis Symphony Orchestra; Jennifer Lucht, Calyx Piano Trio; Marc Thayer, Executive Director of Symphony New Hampshire; and Christopher Stark, Assistant Professor of Composition at Washington University

Festival directors
Scott Andrews has been the Principal Clarinet of the Saint Louis Symphony Orchestra since 2005 and is a sought-after collaborative musician and concert soloist.  Scott was a member of the Boston Symphony Orchestra for 11 years before joining the SLSO, and has also performed with the Philadelphia Orchestra and the Saito Kinen Orchestra.  Scott is the former Woodwind Department Chair at Boston Conservatory and a faculty member of the Tanglewood Music Center in Lenox, Massachusetts.  He collaborates regularly with Seiji Ozawa in Japan at the Saito Kinen Festival as Solo Clarinet of the Mito Chamber Orchestra. Originally from Virginia, Scott studied with Edward Knakal, attended the Virginia Governor's School for the Arts, and studied at the Interlochen Music Center in Michigan.  He graduated with distinction from the New England Conservatory of Music where he was a student of Harold Wright.

Festival Co-Chair Nina Ferrigno is a pianist who appears at major concert venues throughout North America.  She has performed with the Saint Louis Symphony Orchestra, Boston Symphony Orchestra, Boston Pops and the Boston Modern Orchestra Project.  Her chamber music recording of Lansing McLoskey's "Tinted" was released by Albany Records in 2008 and her recording of Elliot Schwarz's "Chamber Concerto IV" with BMOP was released the following year.  Nina's festival appearances include those at Tanglewood, Banff, Norfolk, the Skaneateles Festival and the Coastal Carolina Chamber Music Festival.  She is a graduate of the New England Conservatory of Music where she received Bachelor and Master of Music degrees with distinction.  Her principal teachers were Wha Kyung Byun and Randall Hodgkinson.  Ferrigno is a founding member of the Boston-based Calyx Piano Trio.  She was the long-time member/director of the AUROS Group for New Music and is committed to bringing classical music to new audiences by performing and commissioning new works in a variety of settings.

Events
Three evening concerts and one morning concert highlight the annual MOCM Festival each June. The 2021 Festival concerts will be held on June 14, 16, 18, and 21, at various venues in the St. Louis, Missouri area.  

The Adult Chamber Music Intensive is a week-long workshop for adult instrumentalists. The 2021 ACMI workshop takes place 21–27 June at the Community Music School of Webster University.  

Other events planned for the 2022 season include a Trivia Night on 28 Jan 2022 at the Shrewsbury City Center in Shrewsbury, MO, a Festival Preview concert on 12 May 2022 at the World Chess Hall of Fame, and various private house concerts throughout the year.

The above events had been cancelled in 2020, plus Trivia Night in 2021.

Programs

Programs from the 2019 Festival concerts:

June 17, 2019
 Borodin - String Trio in G minor for 2 violins and cello
Ligeti - Six Bagatelles for Woodwind Quintet
Janacek - Mladi for Woodwind Sextet
Smetana - String Quartet No. 1, "From My Life"

June 19, 2019

 Debussy - Premiere rhapsodie for clarinet and piano
Debussy - Piano Trio in G Major
Debussy - Sonata No.1 for cello and piano
Debussy - Sonata No. 2 for violin and piano

June 20, 2019

 Lash - Around
Dvorak - Piano Trio No. 4, Op. 90, Dumky

June 22, 2019

 Lash - Start, for solo snare drum
 Schumann - Fantasie in C Major, Op. 17 (arr. Lash)
 Lash - Folksongs for flute, percussion, and harp
 Lash - Frayed for String Quartet
 Debussy - Sonata for flute, viola, and harp

Festival Musicians
MOCM’s 2019 season musicians included harpist and composer Hannah Lash, flutist Jennifer Nitchman, oboist Jelena Dirks, bass clarinetist Tzuying Huang, bassoonist Andrew Cuneo, horn player Roger Kaza, percussionist Michael Compitello, pianist Mia Hynes, violinists Catherine French, Eva Kozma, and Angie Smart, violists Michael Casimir and Chris Tantillo, cellists Elizabeth Chung and Jennifer Lucht, the Calyx Piano Trio, and MOCM Festival Directors Scott Andrews, clarinet and Nina Ferrigno, piano.

Location
2019 Festival concerts were held at the First Congregational Church of Webster Groves and the 560 Music Center of Washington University. 

2021 Festival concerts will take place at the First Congregational Church of Webster Groves (14 & 18 June), the 560 Music Center of Washington University (16 June), and the Graham Chapel on the Danforth Campus of Washington University (21 June), all of which was cancelled the year before.

The ACMI workshop is hosted by the Community Music School at Webster University in Webster Groves, MO.

References
Intimate spaces give audience an edge at Missouri Chamber Music Festival.  St. Louis Post-Dispatch June 2018

2017 Radio Interview, St. Louis Public Radio 

Great trios at the Missouri Chamber Music Festival.  St. Louis Post-Dispatch June 2015

Best Chamber Music Festival.  St. Louis Post-Dispatch July 2014

Missouri Chamber Music Festival takes a satisfying journey.  St. Louis Post-Dispatch, June 2014 

Missouri Chamber Music Festival presents grand finale at the Sheldon.  St. Louis Public Radio, June 2014 

Missouri Chamber Music Festival returns for a fourth season.  St. Louis Post-Dispatch, June 2014 

Missouri Chamber Music Festival features Stravinsky and Schubert.  St. Louis Beacon, June 2013 

Missouri Chamber Music Festival celebrates Schubert and Stravinsky.  St. Louis Public Radio, June 2013

External links
Official MOCM Website

Classical music festivals in the United States
Music festivals in Missouri
Tourist attractions in St. Louis County, Missouri
Chamber music festivals
Music festivals established in 2010